Beeches is a brick house in Frankfort, Kentucky whose main block was built in 1818.  In 1979, when it was listed on the National Register of Historic Places, it was in a great lawn in a park-like setting, in contrast to 20th century encroachments on all sides.

It was deemed notable as an outstanding Federal-style structure and as one of just two surviving nineteenth-century buildings along the Leestown Pike in Franklin County, Kentucky.  The other building, Glen Willis, one-fourth mile to the southwest, was already listed on the National Register.

It has a one-and-a-half-story section that was a c.1800 brick house, and a two-and-a-half-story main block, also in brick.  It has later brick and frame additions to the rear and east side.

References

Houses on the National Register of Historic Places in Kentucky
Federal architecture in Kentucky
Houses completed in 1800
Houses in Frankfort, Kentucky
National Register of Historic Places in Frankfort, Kentucky
1800 establishments in Kentucky